CKV DVO/Accountor (christelijke korfbal vereninging Door Vriendschap Omhoog) is a Dutch korfball club located in Bennekom, Netherlands. The club was founded in 1946 and they play their home games in the DVO/Accountor-hal. The team plays in green shirts and white shorts / skirts.

History

DVO/Accountor joined the Korfbal League in the 2010/11 season and has been represented in the top division since then. In 2015 Chinese Taipei international Alice Huang joined the team from Bennekom, but that was not a success. She ended in the second team.

Current squad
Squad for the 2015-16 season - Updated: 1 April 2016

Women
 1  Lisanne van Veldhuisen
 2  Fleur Hoek
 3  Miriam Swart
 5  Romy Theunissen
 14  Lois Bakker
 15  Saskia van der Zee
 17  Hester Heitink
 17  Janine van Schie
 18  Jamilla Vervoort

Men
 7  Chris van Haren
 11  Thijs de Nooij
 12  Jeroen Jansen
 19  Marijn van den Goorbergh
 20  Tim Danen
 22  Bob Gerritsen
 23  Brent Struyf
 24  Dennis Brunt

References

External links
 DVO Official website

Korfball teams in the Netherlands